Antrim Township is one of the thirteen townships of Wyandot County, Ohio, United States.  The 2010 census found 1,243 people in the township.

Geography
Located in the southeastern corner of the county, it borders the following townships:
Eden Township - north
Tod Township, Crawford County - northeast
Dallas Township, Crawford County - east
Grand Prairie Township, Marion County - south
Salt Rock Township, Marion County - southwest corner
Pitt Township - west
Crane Township - northwest

Part of the village of Nevada is located in northeastern Antrim Township.

Name and history
It is the only Antrim Township statewide. The earliest settlers were John Kirby, Jacob Coon, Zachariah Welsh, Jesse Jurey, and Walter Woolsey.

Government
The township is governed by a three-member board of trustees, who are elected in November of odd-numbered years to a four-year term beginning on the following January 1. Two are elected in the year after the presidential election and one is elected in the year before it. There is also an elected township fiscal officer, who serves a four-year term beginning on April 1 of the year after the election, which is held in November of the year before the presidential election. Vacancies in the fiscal officership or on the board of trustees are filled by the remaining trustees.

References

External links
County website

Townships in Wyandot County, Ohio
Irish-American culture in Ohio
Townships in Ohio